Different definitions have been given for the dimension of a complex network or graph.  For example, metric dimension is defined in terms of the resolving set for a graph. Dimension has also been defined based on the box covering method applied to graphs. Here we describe the definition based on the complex network zeta function.  This generalises the definition based on the scaling property of the volume with distance. The best definition depends on the application.

Definition

One usually thinks of dimension for a set which is dense, like the points on a line, for example. Dimension makes sense in a discrete setting, like for graphs, only in the large system limit, as the size tends to infinity. For example, in Statistical Mechanics, one considers discrete points which are located on regular lattices of different dimensions. Such studies have been extended to arbitrary networks, and it is interesting to consider how the definition of dimension can be extended to cover these cases. A very simple and obvious way to extend the definition of dimension to arbitrary large networks is to consider how the volume (number of nodes within a given distance from a specified node) scales as the distance (shortest path connecting two nodes in the graph) is increased. For many systems arising in physics, this is indeed a useful approach. This definition of dimension could be put on a strong mathematical foundation, similar to the definition of Hausdorff dimension for continuous systems. The mathematically robust definition uses the concept of a zeta function for a graph. The complex network zeta function and the graph surface function were introduced to characterize large graphs. They have also been applied to study patterns in Language Analysis. In this section we will briefly review the definition of the functions and discuss further some of their properties which follow from the definition.

We denote by  the distance from node  to node , i.e.,  the length of the shortest path connecting the first node to the second node.  is  if there is no path from node  to node . With this definition, the nodes of the complex network become points in a metric space. Simple generalisations of this definition can be studied, e.g., we could consider weighted edges. The graph surface function, is defined as the number of nodes which are exactly at a distance  from a given node, averaged over all nodes of the network. The complex network zeta function  is defined as

where  is the graph size, measured by the number of nodes. When  is zero all nodes contribute equally to the sum in the previous equation. When the exponent  tends to infinity, the sum gets contributions only from the nearest neighbours of a node. The other terms tend to zero.

The need for taking an average over all nodes can be avoided by using the concept of supremum over nodes, which makes the concept much easier to apply for formally infinite graphs. The definition can be expressed as a weighted sum over the node distances.  This gives the Dirichlet series relation

This definition has been used in the shortcut model to study several processes and their dependence on dimension.

Properties
This has been defined as the dimension of the complex network. If we add more edges to an existing graph, the distances between nodes will decrease. This results in an increase in the value of the complex network zeta function, since  will get pulled inward. If the new links connect remote parts of the system, i.e., if the distances change by amounts which do not remain finite as the graph size , then the dimension tends to increase. For regular discrete d-dimensional lattices  with distance defined using the  norm

Algorithms to calculate the complex network zeta function have been presented.

Values for discrete regular lattices

By choosing a given axis of the lattice and summing over cross-sections for the allowed range of distances along the chosen axis the recursion relation below can be derived

From combinatorics the surface function for a regular lattice can be written as

The following expression for the sum of positive integers raised to a given power  will be useful to calculate the surface function for higher values of :

Another formula for the sum of positive integers raised to a given power  is

The Complex network zeta function for some lattices is given below.

  : 

  : 

)

  : 

 :  (for  near the transition point.)

Random graph zeta function

Random graphs are networks having some number  of vertices, in which each pair is connected with probability , or else the pair is disconnected. Random graphs have a diameter of two with probability approaching one, in the infinite limit. This goes to zero as the system size goes to infinity, and hence most random graphs have their nodes connected by paths of length at most . Also, the mean vertex degree will be .

References

Algebraic graph theory
Network theory